The Greatest Hits Collection is a compilation album released by Bananarama which features their single releases and greatest hits. It was issued by London Records in 1988, eight months after the departure of group member Siobhan Fahey. The track listing differed between versions released in the United States and Canada, as well as those released throughout Europe and other territories.

Composition
Except where otherwise noted, all songs are represented on the album in their "single" variants (or in some cases, a remix) and the version of "I Want You Back" (originally on their Wow! album) on this collection is the newer version of the song with vocals re-recorded by Sara Dallin and Keren Woodward with new member Jacquie O'Sullivan, following the departure of Fahey. One new song, "Love, Truth and Honesty", was released as a single (which featured O'Sullivan's first credits as a song-writing contributor), and peaked inside the UK top 30. The other new track on the compilation was a re-recorded version of the Supremes track "Nathan Jones." Like "I Want You Back", this song was originally included on the Wow! album released before Fahey's departure. The new line-up re-recorded the song with new vocal and instrumental arrangements. This new version, now known as the "Dave Ford Mix", was initially included on vinyl and cassette issues of this compilation, and on the original Canadian CD pressing. It was subsequently remixed by in-house PWL Mixmaster Pete Hammond and released as a single, reaching the UK Top 20 and this version replaced both the earlier "Psycho 7" Edit" and "Dave Ford Mix" versions on the compilation. Later re-issues have added on various remixes, as well as a cover of the Beatles hit, "Help!".

Track listing

Original edition

Reissue

US edition

Canadian edition

The Greatest Hits & More More More

In 2008, a reworked version of The Greatest Hits Collection was released. Titled The Greatest Hits & More More More, this release featured an expanded track list incorporating many of the singles not present on the original compilation, most notably those from Pop Life and Please Yourself. The track list is as follows:

 "Venus"
 "Love in the First Degree"
 "I Want You Back"
 "Robert De Niro's Waiting"
 "Cruel Summer"
 "Really Saying Something" (with Fun Boy Three)
 "It Ain't What You Do (It's The Way That You Do It)" (with Fun Boy Three)
 "Shy Boy"
 "Na Na Hey Hey (Kiss Him Goodbye)"
 "Love, Truth & Honesty"
 "Nathan Jones"
 "I Heard a Rumour"
 "Movin' On"
 "More More More" (album version)
 "I Can't Help It"
 "Only Your Love"
 "Preacher Man"
 "Long Train Running"
 "Aie a Mwana"
 "A Trick of the Night" (PWL 7" version)
 "Rough Justice"
 "Cheers Then"

2017 collector's edition

In 2017, in order to coincide with Siobhan Fahey's return to the group for The Original Line Up Tour, London Records released an expanded version of the original 1988 edition as a double album. The tracklist was updated to include all their UK singles released between 1981 and 1988 on disc one and a selection of remixes from the same period was included on the second disc. The cover art remains the same but the booklet was updated with current pictures of the group and new liner notes about the newly included songs.

Personnel
Bananarama
Sara Dallin – vocals
Siobhan Fahey – vocals
Jacquie O'Sullivan – vocals on "I Want You Back", "Love, Truth and Honesty", "Nathan Jones", "Help!" and "Preacher Man"
Keren Woodward – vocals

Musicians
Fun Boy Three – vocals on "Really Saying Something" and "It Ain't What You Do It's the Way That You Do It"
Lananeeneenoonoo – additional vocals on "Help!"

Additional Personnel
Andrew Biscomb – sleeve design
Peter Barrett – sleeve design
Herb Ritts – cover sleeve photography
Andrew McPherson – inner sleeve photography

Charts

Weekly charts

Year-end chart

Certifications and sales

References

Bananarama compilation albums
1988 greatest hits albums
London Records compilation albums